Sparganothis striata is a species of moth of the family Tortricidae. It is found in North America, including Arizona, British Columbia, California, Colorado, Montana, New Mexico, North Dakota, Oklahoma, Texas, Utah and Washington.

The wingspan is 22–23 mm.

References

Moths described in 1884
Sparganothis